Gail Annette Marquis (born November 18, 1954 in New York City, New York) is an American former basketball player who competed in the 1976 Summer Olympics.

USA Basketball

Marquis was named to the USA Basketball National Team to represent the US at the 1976 Olympics, the first year that women's basketball would be played at the Olympics. The USA team ended with a record of 3–2, losing to the eventual gold medal champion USSR in the semifinal game, and winning the final game against Czechoslovakia to take home the silver medal.

Marquis remained on the National team in the subsequent year as the team competed in the 1977 World University Games. After winning the opening game against Germany, Marquis had a double-double with 17 points and 11 rebounds to help the USA team defeat Mexico. Marquis scored 16 points in a close game against Romania, which USA team won 76–73. The USSR team was too strong for the USA team, winning twice against the USA team, including the gold medal game. The USA team captured the silver medal. Marquis was the third leading scorer on the team, averaging 12.0 points per game and the second leading rebounder, with 7.0 per game.

After basketball
Following her basketball career, Gail Marquis went on to become a Wall Street executive. In 2011, she married Audrey Smaltz. Her life story is chronicled in a 2016 University of Phoenix commercial.

References

1954 births
Living people
American women's basketball players
Basketball players at the 1976 Summer Olympics
Basketball players from New York City
LGBT African Americans
LGBT basketball players
American LGBT sportspeople
American LGBT rights activists
LGBT people from New York (state)
Medalists at the 1976 Summer Olympics
Olympic silver medalists for the United States in basketball
Queens College, City University of New York alumni
Universiade silver medalists for the United States
Universiade medalists in basketball
Lesbian sportswomen
Medalists at the 1977 Summer Universiade
21st-century American women
United States women's national basketball team players